The 2002–03 CERH European League was the 38th edition of the CERH European League organized by CERH. Its Final Four was held on 10 and 11 May 2004 at Pazo dos Deportes de Riazor, in A Coruña, Spain.

Preliminary round

|}

First round

|}

Group stage
In each group, teams played against each other home-and-away in a home-and-away round-robin format.

The two first qualified teams advanced to the Final Four.

Group A

Group B

Final four
The Final Four was played at Pazo dos Deportes de Riazor, in A Coruña, Spain.

Home team Liceo achieved its 4th title. Al games were decided after a penalty shootout.

Bracket

References

External links
 CERH website

2002 in roller hockey
2003 in roller hockey
Rink Hockey Euroleague